Causeway Bay is one of the 13 constituencies in the Wan Chai District.

The constituency returns one district councillor to the Wan Chai District Council, with an election every four years. The seat was last held by Independent Cathy Yau.

Causeway Bay constituency is loosely based on Causeway Bay area with estimated population of 12,777.

Councillors represented

Election results

2010s

2000s

1990s

Notes

References

Causeway Bay
Constituencies of Hong Kong
Constituencies of Wan Chai District Council
1994 establishments in Hong Kong
Constituencies established in 1994